George Avery may refer to:

 Gordon George Avery (1925–2006), Australian track and field athlete
 George Avery (professor) (1926–2004), American professor of German Studies
 George Avery Young (1866–1900), English sportsman who played rugby and cricket
 George Sherman Avery Jr. (1903–1994), American horticulturalist

See also
 George Every (1909–2003), British historian and theologian